Mahmudabad (also Romanized as Maḩmūdābād) is a village in Sakhvid Rural District, Nir District, Taft County, Yazd Province, Iran. At the 2006 census, its population was 139, in 33 families.

References 

Populated places in Taft County